SMY Hohenzollern was the name of several yachts used by the German Emperors between 1878 and 1918, named after their House of Hohenzollern.

History

SMY Hohenzollern I 
The first Hohenzollern was built 1876–1878 by Norddeutsche Schiffbau-Gesellschaft in Kiel. Her interiors were designed by architect Heinrich Moldenschardt. In 1892 she was renamed Kaiseradler (Imperial eagle) and scrapped in 1912.

SMY Hohenzollern II 

Hohenzollern II was launched on 27 June 1892, the build completed the same year by AG Vulcan Stettin.

She was used as the Imperial Yacht and aviso from 1893 to July 1914. From 1894 to 1914, with the exception of 1906, Emperor Wilhelm II used her on his annual prolonged Nordlandfahrt trips to Norway. In total he spent over four years on board.

In June 1914 Hohenzollern II attended the Kiel regatta and on 25 June the last state banquet was held on board to entertain officers of the British fleet whose ships had been invited to attend.

At the end of July 1914 Hohenzollern II was put out of service in Kiel, the last captain being Kapitän zur See Johannes V. Karpf. The ship became property of the Weimar Republic in 1918. Struck on 27 February 1920, she was scrapped in 1923 in Wilhelmshaven.

SMY Hohenzollern III 
Hohenzollern III was launched in September 1914 in Stettin but never finished due to war.  She was struck in 1919 and scrapped in 1923 at Deutsche Werke in Kiel.

Philately  
The imperial yacht was the subject of the Yacht issue produced for postal use in German colonies.

References

Bibliography

External links 

 Klaus Kramer - S.M.Y. Hohenzollern

Royal and presidential yachts
Auxiliary ships of the Imperial German Navy
SMY Hohenzollern
Steam yachts
1878 ships
Ships built in Kiel